Calvin Lee Vail (born August 18, 1995), known online as LeafyIsHere or simply Leafy, is an American former YouTuber best known for reaction, drama, and gaming videos with commentary. 

Beginning in 2016, Vail was involved in several conflicts with other YouTubers which led to allegations of cyberbullying. Vail was terminated by YouTube in 2020, citing repeated violations of their harassment policies.

Career 
The LeafyIsHere channel was a drama, commentary, and storytime channel. On the channel, Vail mainly commented on gossip involving online content creators and made videos telling life stories. He had made rants on popular YouTubers such as Onision.

Vail started his channel in 2011, and began uploading content in 2013. He focused primarily on reaction and gaming videos.

Controversies and channel termination 
In 2015 and 2016, Vail was the target of a swatting campaign, with repeated calls to the police between December 2015 and February 2016. At that time, he resided in Layton, Utah.

According to Bryan Menegus of Gizmodo, Vail mocked a man in 2016 with a learning disability, and had earlier made fun of an autistic man known as TommyNC2010, after which YouTube and Reddit communities rallied behind Tommy, prompting Vail to release an apology.

In 2016, YouTuber iDubbbz featured Leafy in an episode of his Content Cop series, accusing him and his videos of cyberbullying, among other criticisms. Also in 2016, Vail accused YouTuber Evalion of supporting Nazism and antisemitism. Shortly after Vail drew attention to her, Evalion was banned by YouTube. Later that year, one of Vail's videos in which he called transgender vlogger Milo Stewart an "it" and a "creature" was taken down by YouTube. Vail made three videos attacking Stewart.

Starting in December 2017, Vail's YouTube channel went on a hiatus for more than two years.

In 2019, iDubbbz's Content Cop video criticizing Vail was taken down after it was determined to be in violation of YouTube's guidelines.

After a more than two-year-long hiatus, Vail returned to YouTube with a video insulting iDubbbz in April 2020, following which he resumed posting frequently. In July, Vail began criticizing Twitch streamer Pokimane and her supporters based on speculation about her personal life.

On August 21, 2020, Vail's YouTube account was permanently terminated. According to The Verge, Vail's channel had three violations in the previous three months, such as cyberbullying and encouraging viewers to disrupt other people's streams. A YouTube spokesperson said the channel had repeatedly violated YouTube's policies on harassment. Following the ban, Vail began streaming frequently on Twitch. He has also posted on competing video platform StoryFire. He also got into conflicts with YouTuber Ethan Klein.

On September 11, 2020, Vail's Twitch account was also banned. Earlier that day, Vail had tweeted about receiving a strike on his account from Twitch for "hateful conduct and threats of violence against a person or group of people". Twitch did not comment on the ban or indicate whether it was permanent.

References 

1995 births
American YouTubers
Commentary YouTubers
Cyberbullying
Gaming-related YouTube channels
Gaming YouTubers
Living people
People from Utah
Twitch (service) streamers
YouTube channels closed in 2020
YouTube channels launched in 2011
YouTube controversies